Paul Michael Guidry (born January 14, 1944) is a former college and professional American football player. In 1966, Guidry was AFL-drafted by Buffalo Bills (Round 8).

Football
A linebacker, he played college football for McNeese State University and in the American Football League and the National Football League for the Buffalo Bills from 1966 through 1972. Guidry (#59)played linebacker for the Buffalo Bills from 1966 to 1972 and then he (#46) moved to the Houston Oilers for the 1973 season.  While at Buffalo, he spent three years as a player representative for National Football League Players Association.  In 1970 Paul was selected for the All-AFC (American Football Conference of the NFL) Team.

Guidry was named one of the top 15 players to wear the #59 for the Buffalo Bills.

Personal life
Guidry lives in Mt. Juliet, Tennessee, which is located just outside Nashville and only about 30 miles from Middle Tennessee. Guidry has supported Golf Tournament For Cystic Fibrosis in Tennessee.

He served in the United States Army Reserve for six years.

See also
Other American Football League players

References

1944 births
Living people
American football linebackers
Buffalo Bills players
Houston Oilers players
McNeese Cowboys football players
People from Mount Juliet, Tennessee
American Football League players